The 2016 Corpus Christi Fury season was the thirteenth season for the American indoor football franchise, and their first in American Indoor Football.

On October 1, 2015, the Fury joined American Indoor Football from the recently folded X-League Indoor Football. The team cancelled several games during the season and only played one game against an AIF member. While never announced by the team itself, the Fury appeared to have folded before their game on May 15 against the New Mexico Stars, giving the Stars 24 hours' notice that they would be unable to make the game. They also announced their May 22 home game was cancelled on the day of the game over social media without explanation.

Schedule
Key:

Exhibition
All start times are local to home team

Regular season
All start times are local to home team

Standings

Roster

References

Corpus Christi Fury
Corpus Christi Fury